The Wonderful Flight to the Mushroom Planet is a children's science fiction  novel written by Eleanor Cameron, illustrated by Robert Henneberger, and published by Little, Brown in 1954. It is set in Pacific Grove, California, and on Basidium, a tiny habitable moon of Earth, invisible from the planet in its orbit 50,000 miles away. The "Mushroom Planet", visited by the protagonists David Topman and Chuck Masterson, is covered in various types of mushrooms and is populated by little green people who are in a state of distress.

The Wonderful Flight was published under the Atlantic Monthly Press imprint of Little, Brown in September 1954, and it received a starred review from Kirkus Reviews.

Plot summary

When two boys find an ad in a newspaper asking for two young boys to build a spaceship, they quickly construct one out of old tin and scrap wood (including the hull of a derelict rowboat), and bring it to the advertiser. This man is the mysterious Mr. Tyco Bass, an inventor and scientist. Using his marvelous stroboscopic polarizing filter he shows the boys a previously undetected satellite of the Earth, which he calls Basidium-X. He refits their spaceship, giving them some special fuel he invented to power it, and tells them to fly to the mushroom planet (after getting their parents' permission). He warns them that their trip will only be successful if they bring a mascot.

When it is time for launch, they grab David's hen, Mrs. Pennyfeather, at the last moment for a mascot, and rocket into space. They find the planet of Basidium to be a small, verdant world covered in soft moss and tree-size mushrooms. They quickly meet some residents of the mushroom planet, small men with large heads and slightly green skin, of the same people as the mysterious Mr. Bass. They tell the boys that their planet has had a crisis and that everyone is slowly dying of a mysterious sickness. The boys meet up with the king of the planet, the Great Ta, and end up solving the natives' problem before returning to Earth.

Other editions
 Viaje Maravilloso Al Planeta de los Hongos (1965), Spanish language edition
 Scholastic (1966), paperback
 Joy Street / Little, Brown (1988), paperback; cover by Peter Sís
 Little, Brown (1998); cover by Kevin Hawkes
 Little, Brown (2003); cover by Steve Vance

See also
 Little green men

References

1954 Canadian novels
1954 science fiction novels
Canadian science fiction novels
Canadian children's novels
Children's science fiction novels
Space exploration novels
Novels by Eleanor Cameron
Works set on fictional moons
1954 children's books
Fictional fungi